Robert Oliver (15 June 171015 November 1784) was Archdeacon of the East Riding from 1759 until his death.

He was educated at Merton College, Oxford. On his appointment as Archdeacon he commented "Silence would best become me."

References

1710 births
18th-century English Anglican priests
Alumni of Merton College, Oxford
Archdeacons of the East Riding
1784 deaths